Ivan Jovanović may refer to:

 Ivan Jovanović (coach) (born 1962), Serbian football player, manager and coach
 Ivan Jovanović (footballer, born 1978), Serbian player
 Ivan Jovanović (footballer, born 1990), Serbian football midfielder
 Ivan Jovanović (footballer, born 1991), Croatian football forward
 Ivan Jovanović or "Crni"(died 1958), Bosnian war criminal from Šurmanci, Herzegovina